Paul Sculfor (born 1 February 1971) is a British male model as well as a TV and film actor.

Background

Between the ages of eight to ten, Sculfor studied gymnastics, and when he was 10, he joined the Dagenham Boxing Club. He had one competitive fight for them, at 15, which was a late start in the boxing world. He then joined the Alma Boxing Club and competed with them for the next three years. As a schoolboy, Sculfor boxed at the British Championships and reached the semi-final. In his teenage boxing career, he won the Northeast London title and the South East England title. Between the ages of 12 to 14, he also competed as a schoolboy in the trampoline event and finished in the top three for three years in a row.

Sculfor's grandfather was John Hawkridge, a decorated British sergeant in the Second World War, who owned a number of market stalls in the famous East End's Roman Road and Rathbone Street markets. As a kid, Sculfor spent nearly all his weekends there.

Modelling career
At the age of 21, Sculfor won the modelling competition 'The Face of 92' in association with Select Model Management and the Daily Mirror. Sculfor was unaware his mother had entered him in the competition; he was in the hospital having had his appendix removed when he received the letter saying he was in the finals of the competition, alongside Rod Stewart's wife Penny Lancaster. The judges included Tandy, the owner of Select Model Management and Gary Stretch.

Sculfor's first modelling job was for The Face magazine and in the autumn of 1993, Sculfor worked alongside Bridget Hall on the winter/fall 1993 campaign for Banana Republic, shot by prolific photographer Bruce Weber. The campaign featured on billboards all over New York's Times Square.

Sculfor soon moved to Europe, where he was working out of Milan and Paris with the likes of Giorgio Armani, Versace, and Jean Paul Gaultier, Paul Smith and Valentino.

In 1994 Sculfor and Laurence Vanhaeverbeke modelled for the Christian Dior fragrance Tendre Poison, which was photographed by Tyen, and the campaign ran for three years.

Due to his success as a male model, he has frequently been referred to as 'the original supermodel'. One article commented on 'the face that's worth a million dollars'.

Selected campaigns
 Patrick Cox, 1993
Versace with Gisele Bundchen, 2009
Louis Vuitton, 2011
 Aramis, 2012
''Esquire, 2012
 Other – for a full list of campaigns visit Models.com

Selected covers
Attitude Magazine, 1997.
 Out Magazine, 2009.
 Fantastic Man, July 2005.

Selected TV campaigns
Levi's Campaign, 1997. Directed by Michel Gondry.
Lynx (deodorant) Campaign, 2001 with Lisa Snowdon.
Landrover, 2006. Freelander campaign shot in Thailand.
Next Campaign, 2007 with Alessandra Ambrosio.
Next Campaign, 2008.
Aramis Campaign, 2011.
Louis Vuitton Campaign, 2011.

Film and Television

Selected filmography
Di Di Hollywood (2010) … Steve Richards
Psychosis (2010) … David
Baseline (2010) … Mark

Television appearances
Britain's Next Top Model (2012, 2016) … Himself/Judge
Cinema 3 (2010) … Himself
Light Lunch (1997) … Himself
"Five A Side" (2014) … Lee Kennedy
Death in Paradise (2015) … Nicky Dexter – Episode 4.2

Selected presenter work
San Remo Festival, 2009. In 2009, Sculfor was the co-host for the San Remo Festival alongside Paolo Bonolis, the first time a male had presented alongside Mr. Bonolis as it was usually a female presenter.

Awards
Most Stylish Man Award as part of the GQ and Ermenegildo Zegna Elegant Men of The Year' awards in 2010.

Personal life
Prior to getting married, Sculfor had a series of high-profile girlfriends, including Lisa Snowdon, Jennifer Aniston and Cameron Diaz. In 2016, Sculfor married socialite Federica Amati.

See also
List of people on the cover of Attitude magazine

References

External links
 
 Models.com page for Paul Sculfor
 BNTM profile
 Us magazine profile for Paul Sculfor

1971 births
Living people
People from Upminster
Models from London
English male models
English male television actors